James Garbett (1802-1879) was a British academic and Anglican cleric who became the Archdeacon of Chichester.

He was a Fellow of Brasenose College, Oxford. He was an Evangelical and an opponent of the Oxford Movement.

He was the anti-Tractarian candidate in the election of the Professor of Poetry in 1841/2. The 'Oxford Movement' candidate to replace John Keble in that position was Isaac Williams. Slender as his credentials were for the post, Garbett won, in a politicised campaign run by Ashurst Turner Gilbert, Principal of Brasenose.

He was appointed Archdeacon of Chichester in 1851 and served until 1879.

In his book Diocesan Synods and Convocation he argued for the abolition of synods.

Works
Christ, as Prophet, Priest, and King: being a Vindication of the Church of England from Theological Novelties (1842) Bampton Lectures
De Rei Poeticae Idea (1843)
De Re Critica Praelectiones Oxonii Habitae (1847)
Diocesan Synods and Convocation (1852)

Notes

1802 births
1879 deaths
19th-century English non-fiction writers
Archdeacons of Chichester
19th-century English Anglican priests
Fellows of Brasenose College, Oxford
English religious writers
Oxford Professors of Poetry
English male non-fiction writers
19th-century English male writers